Sheyla is a given name. Notable people with the name include:

Sheyla Bonnick, Jamaican singer and performer, active since 1975
Sheyla Tadeo (born 1973), Mexican actress, comedian, and singer

See also
Sheila
Shela (name)

Feminine given names